Paloznak is a village in the region of Balatonfüred, Veszprém county, Hungary. It was first mentioned in the  Veszprém Valley Monastery's  Deed of Gift  around 970 a. D. According to archaeological findings the place was inhabited since 5000 years. According to the 2001 census, population is about 401 people (2008 estimation is 440). The village is famous about preserving the traditional settlement structure of the Balaton-highlands. Locals make a living from wine and tourism.

Location 
Paloznak is located at the northern side of Lake Balaton, the southern flanks of Bakony mountain.  The nearby villages are Csopak (from west) and Lovas (from east), the closest city is Balatonfüred. It can be reached on the road No. 71.

Flora and climate 
The vicinity of Lake Balaton affects the weather heavily, the local microclimate differs from the highlands': the village is sheltered from the wind, the weather is mild all year. The soil is characterized by clayey  sand and red marl, along with red sandstone. In the woods one can find oak, beech, and pine, and in the gardens peach, apricot, almond, and – first of all – grape yield.

History 
Archeological research shows that the location has been inhabited since 5000 years. Romans had two villae rusticae. The etymology of Paloznak ('po loznik' means 'at the wineyards' in Slavic language) suggests that the village was populated by Slavic peoples. In 1961, the village became the part of the Alsóörs-Lovas-Paloznak Common Council, but in 1969 Paloznak formed a new Common Council with Csopak. In 1990 the locals formed an independent municipality. In the 1990s the village experienced a lot of developments, new buildings were built, old ones rebuilt while the village maintained and preserved its original style and structure, which was acknowledged by the Hild János Award in 1998. The population of the village is growing, people from nearby cities and even from Budapest choose Paloznak as their new home. The attractiveness of the village is lying in its tranquillity, charm and friendliness of the locals.

Mayors of Paloznak 
 Balogh Lajos 1990-1998
 Czeglédy Ákos 1998-

Honorary citizens 
 Szendi György teacher postumus (1999)
 Habsburg Ottó, President of the Paneuropean Union (2000)
 Karl Josef Rauber Apostolic Nuncio (2000)
 Márffy István (2000)
 Ferenczi Dávid Jimbo (2009)
 Dr. Csontos Gyula priest postumus (2001)
 vitéz Ajtós József dean (2002)
 Dr. Vörösmarty Dániel professor (2003)
 Makk Károly film director (2005)
 Haumann Péter actor (2006)
 Ponori Thewrewk Aurél Hungarian astronomer (2009)

Sights of Paloznak 

 Roman Catholic Church
 belfry
 village houses
 Millennium Park
 Dragon Fountain
 King Ladislaus Sculpture
 Fountain of Heroes
 Playground
 Saint Donatus Sculpture
 Calvary
 Welschriesling-study path,
 Pongrácz Castle
 Hampasz Fountain
 Antall József Sculpture

Twin cities 
  Korond
  Pálpataka (since 1998)

Sources 
 Website of Paloznak Municipality
 Czilliné Egyed Ilona: Cultural History of Paloznak

External links 
 Website of Paloznak Municipality
 Cultural History of Paloznak
 European Wineroads website

References 

Populated places in Veszprém County